Chokwe Antar Lumumba (born March 29, 1983) is an American attorney, activist, and politician serving as the 53rd mayor of Jackson, Mississippi, the 7th consecutive African-American to hold the position.

He was first elected in 2017. In the primary, Lumumba soundly won the Democratic nomination, defeating both incumbent mayor Tony Yarber and State Senator John Horhn. Lumumba went on to win the general election in a landslide. He is a self-described progressive and socialist. Lumumba has also referred to himself as a political revolutionary.

He is the son of former mayor and Black nationalist activist Chokwe Lumumba, who served briefly as mayor of Jackson before his death in 2014.

Mayor of Jackson, Mississippi

Lumumba was elected mayor in June 2017 with 93% of the vote. The Nation commented that "Lumumba lit up the left press with his promise—delivered later that month in a speech at the People's Summit in Chicago—to make Jackson 'the most radical city on the planet.'”

In the summer of 2018, Lumumba attended Michael Bloomberg's "Bloomberg Harvard City Leadership Initiative." The City of Jackson noted that the Initiative was created by Bloomberg to train leaders to "manage the complexities of running a city, and to have opportunities to learn from one another."  Four months later, in November 2018, Bloomberg gave the City of Jackson $1 million to create art spotlighting food insecurity. Lumumba won reelection in 2021 with almost seventy percent of the vote.

Jackson Zoo crisis

In April 2018, when the Jackson Zoo announced plans to consider moving from its current West Jackson location, Lumumba joined Working Together Jackson, the Zoo Area Progressive Partnership, Rosemont Missionary Baptist Church and other community groups, in an effort to prevent the zoo from moving. He described the proposed plan as disingenuous and disrespectful. A city investigation discovered that the Jackson Zoological Society had mismanaged funds and failed to pay $6 million in water bills.

The mayor took direct control of the zoo and approved $200,000 to renovate it. The zoo reopened in August 2020 under city control.

National politics 
In February 2020, Lumumba endorsed Bernie Sanders in the 2020 Democratic Party presidential primaries. Bernie Sanders likewise endorsed Lumumba for reelection in 2021. July 29, 2021, it was announced via Nina Turner's social media that Mayor Lumumba had endorsed her in Ohio's 11th Congressional District 2021 Special Election, the seat which was left empty when representative Marcia Fudge was selected by President Joe Biden for HUD Secretary. The race garnered nationwide attention as it split the Democratic Party between its progressive and moderate wings.

Personal life
Lumumba has two children with his wife, Ebony. His wife is Associate Professor and Chair of the Department of English, Foreign Languages, and Speech Communication at Jackson State University.

References

External links

1983 births
African-American mayors in Mississippi
American socialists
Living people
Mayors of Jackson, Mississippi
Mississippi Democrats
Mississippi lawyers
Texas Southern University alumni
Tuskegee University alumni
Mississippi socialists
21st-century African-American people
20th-century African-American people